The 2002 season was the Pittsburgh Steelers' 70th as a professional sports franchise and as a member of the National Football League.

The Steelers were coming off a 13–3 record in 2001 and making an appearance in the AFC Championship Game. The team failed to improve their 13–3 record, finishing 10–5–1, although this record was good enough for a division championship. With their finish, the Steelers became the first champions of the newly created AFC North. Bill Cowher's team won the Wild Card Game, defeating the Cleveland Browns at home, but lost to AFC South champion Tennessee Titans in the divisional round.

Week 4 saw Kordell Stewart's final game as the Steelers' starting quarterback, as he was replaced by Tommy Maddox during the game. Even though he did relieve an injured Maddox, Stewart never regained his job as he was released following the season.

Offseason

NFL draft

Undrafted free agents

Personnel

Roster

Preseason

Schedule

Regular season

Schedule

Note: Intra-divisional opponents are in bold text.

Game summaries

Week 1: at New England Patriots

Week 2: vs. Oakland Raiders

at Heinz Field, Pittsburgh, Pennsylvania

 Game time: 8:30 pm EDT
 Game weather: 70 °F (Cloudy)
 Game attendance: 62,260
 Referee: Bill Leavy
 TV announcers: (ESPN) Mike Patrick (play by play), Paul Maguire (color commentator), Joe Theismann (color commentator), Suzy Kolber (sideline reporter)

With the loss, the Steelers went 0-2 heading into their bye week.

Week 4: vs. Cleveland Browns

at Heinz Field, Pittsburgh, Pennsylvania

 Game time: 1:00 pm EDT
 Game weather: 70 °F (Sunny)
 Game attendance: 62,864
 Referee: Bernie Kukar
 TV announcers: (CBS) Gus Johnson (play by play), Brent Jones (color commentator)

Kordell Stewart began the game, going 15–25 for 143 yards, but was intercepted by Robert Griffith of the Browns. At this point his Pittsburgh career all but ended when he was benched and replaced by backup Tommy Maddox, who hadn't thrown a pass in the NFL since 1995 with the Giants but had resurrected his career with stints with the New Jersey Red Dogs in the Arena Football League and a championship season in the ill-fated XFL. With the Steelers down 13–6, Maddox found Plaxico Burress for the tying touchdown just before the two-minute warning. The game went to overtime, but Maddox was picked off on his first throw of the extra quarter. The Browns, however, gagged when Phil Dawson missed a 45-yard field goal try. With new life the Steelers led by Maddox marched in range for Todd Peterson's 31-yarder and the 16–13 final.

Week 5: at New Orleans Saints

at Louisiana Superdome, New Orleans, Louisiana

 Game time: 1:00 pm EDT
 Game weather: Dome
 Game attendance: 67,734
 Referee: Larry Nemmers
 TV announcers: (CBS) Gus Johnson (play by play), Brent Jones (color commentator) 
Tommy Maddox made his first start replacing an ineffective Kordell Stewart

Week 6: at Cincinnati Bengals

at Paul Brown Stadium, Cincinnati, Ohio

 Game time: 1:00 pm EDT
 Game weather: 54 °F (Sunny)
 Game attendance: 63,900
 Referee: Ron Winter
 TV announcers: (CBS) Kevin Harlan (play by play), Randy Cross (color commentator), and Beasley Reece (Sideline Reporter)

Week 7: vs. Indianapolis Colts

at Heinz Field, Pittsburgh, Pennsylvania

 Game time: 9:00 pm EDT
 Game weather: 46 °F (Partly Cloudy)
 Game attendance: 62,800
 Referee: Walt Coleman
 TV announcers: (ABC) Al Michaels (play by play), John Madden (color commentator), Melissa Stark (sideline reporter)

Week 8: at Baltimore Ravens

at Ravens Stadium, Baltimore, Maryland

 Game time: 1:00 pm EST
 Game weather: 61 °F (Sunny)
 Game attendance: 69,638
 Referee: Johnny Grier
 TV announcers: (CBS) Gus Johnson (play by play), Brent Jones (color commentator)

Week 9: at Cleveland Browns

at Cleveland Browns Stadium, Cleveland, Ohio

 Game time: 1:00 pm EST
 Game weather: 40 °F (Sunny)
 Game attendance: 73,718
 Referee: Mike Carey
 TV announcers: (CBS) Ian Eagle (play by play), Solomon Wilcots (color commentator), Marcus Allen (sideline reporter)

Week 10: vs. Atlanta Falcons

at Heinz Field, Pittsburgh, Pennsylvania

 Game time: 1:00 pm EST
 Game weather: 66 °F (Cloudy)
 Game attendance: 62,779
 Referee: Terry McAulay
 TV announcers: (FOX) Sam Rosen (play by play), Bill Maas (color commentator), Alby Oxenreiter (sideline reporter)

In the first NFL tie since 1997, Tommy Maddox erupted with 473 passing yards (a club record that stood until Ben Roethlisberger broke it in 2009) and connected on four touchdown throws in his first matchup against the coach who drafted him in Denver, Dan Reeves. Reeves' Falcons, however, were surging behind the running of sophomore quarterback Michael Vick. A 34–17 Steelers lead in the fourth could not be held as Warrick Dunn and Vick rushed the Falcons in range for a one-yard Bob Christian rushing touchdown, a Jay Feely field goal, and finally the tying Vick rushing score with 32 seconds remaining in regulation. In overtime the Steelers drove to range of a 48-yard field goal try by Todd Peterson, this after he'd missed a 40-yarder in regulation. The Falcons' Brian Finneran had caught six passes for 72 yards, but in his career debut on special teams he pulled off the play of the game by blocking the kick. Late in the extra quarter Maddox was picked off by Kevin Mathis, but the subsequent 56-yad Feely try was blocked, with one second left on the clock. Maddox launched a desperation heave and Burress caught it, but was ruled down at the one-foot line with the game declared over. This would be the last time the Steelers would tie until Week 1 of the 2018 season.

Week 11: at Tennessee Titans

at Adelphia Coliseum, Nashville, Tennessee

 Game time: 1:00 pm EST
 Game weather: 42 °F (Partly Cloudy)
 Game attendance: 68,804
 Referee: Tony Corrente
 TV announcers: (CBS) Gus Johnson (play by play), Brent Jones (color commentator), Marcus Allen (sideline reporter)

Maddox's career nearly ended in tragedy as he threw a pass that Hines Ward turned into a 72-yard touchdown, but after completing just 14 of 28 throws for 194 yards and three picks he was sacked; the hit left him briefly paralyzed and he was taken to the hospital on a stretcher. He recovered from the hit but Kordell Stewart had to come off the bench for what turned out to be his final three games with the Steelers. He completed 13 of 17 throws for two touchdowns and the Steelers also completed two two-point tries. It wasn't enough as the Titans behind 257 passing yards (with two touchdowns) by Steve McNair and 121 rushing yards (McNair and Eddie George accounted for 103 of them) won 31–23.

Week 12: vs. Cincinnati Bengals

at Heinz Field, Pittsburgh, Pennsylvania

 Game time: 1:00 pm EST
 Game weather: 45 °F (Partly Cloudy)
 Game attendance: 60,473
 Referee: Ed Hochuli
 TV announcers: (CBS) Craig Bolerjack (play by play), Craig James (color commentator)

Week 13: at Jacksonville Jaguars

at Alltel Stadium, Jacksonville, Florida

 Game time: 1:00 pm EST
 Game weather: 53 °F (Sunny)
 Game attendance: 55,260
 Referee: Gerald Austin
 TV announcers: (CBS) Gus Johnson and Brent Jones

Kordell Stewart made his last start as a Steelers quarterback, running for a touchdown. Jeff reed kicked six field goals. Maddox regained his starting position the following week despite Stewart performing well.

Week 14: vs. Houston Texans

at Heinz Field, Pittsburgh, Pennsylvania

 Game time: 1:00 pm EST
 Game weather: 35 °F (Cloudy)
 Game attendance: 58,551
 Referee: Bob McElwee
 TV announcers: (CBS) Ian Eagle (play by play), Solomon Wilcots (color commentator)

The Steelers were stunned at home against the expansion Houston Texans, failing to find any offensive footing at all. With the embarrassing loss, the Steelers fell to 7-5-1.

Week 15: vs. Carolina Panthers

at Heinz Field, Pittsburgh, Pennsylvania

 Game time: 1:00 pm EST
 Game weather: 40 °F (Cloudy)
 Game attendance: 58,586
 Referee: Dick Hantak
 TV announcers: (FOX) Sam Rosen (play by play), Bill Maas (color commentator)

Week 16: at Tampa Bay Buccaneers

at Raymond James Stadium, Tampa, Florida

 Game time: 9:00 pm EST
 Game weather: 
 Game attendance: 65,864
 Referee: Larry Nemmers
 TV announcers: (ABC) Al Michaels (play by play), John Madden (color commentator), Melissa Stark (sideline reporter)

Week 17: vs. Baltimore Ravens

at Heinz Field, Pittsburgh, Pennsylvania

 Game time: 1:00 pm EST
 Game weather: 32 °F (Cloudy)
 Game attendance: 61,961
 Referee: Ron Winter
 TV announcers: (CBS) Kevin Harlan (play by play), Randy Cross (color commentator), and Beasley Reece (sideline reporter)

Standings

Playoffs

Schedule

Game summaries

AFC Wild Card Playoff: vs. Cleveland Browns

at Heinz Field, Pittsburgh, Pennsylvania

 Game time: 1:00 pm EST
 Game weather: 27 °F (Light Snow)
 Game attendance: 62,595
 Referee: Bill Carollo
 TV announcers: (CBS) Greg Gumbel, Phil Simms and Armen Keteyian

AFC Divisional Playoff: at Tennessee Titans

at Adelphia Coliseum, Nashville, Tennessee

 Game time: 4:30 p.m. EST
 Game weather: 34 °F (Sunny)
 Game attendance: 68,809
 Referee: Ron Blum
 TV announcers: (CBS) Dick Enberg, Dan Dierdorf and Bonnie Bernstein

Honors and awards

Pro Bowl representatives
See: 2003 Pro Bowl

 No. 55 Joey Porter-Outside Linebacker
 No. 66 Alan Faneca-Offensive Guard
 No. 86 Hines Ward-Wide Receiver
 No. 92 Jason Gildon-Outside Linebacker

References

External links 
 2002 Pittsburgh Steelers season at Pro Football Reference 
 2002 Pittsburgh Steelers season statistics at jt-sw.com 

Pittsburgh Steelers seasons
Pittsburgh Steelers
AFC North championship seasons
Pitts